Persatuan Sepakbola Badung is an Indonesian football club based in Badung Regency, Bali, Indonesia that competes in Liga 3. Nicknamed Laskar Keris (Keris Warriors), the club was founded in 2008.

History 
After Persekaba Badung sold to Yahukimo Regency government and changed to Yahukimo F.C., Badung Regency did not have a representative in Liga Indonesia. In 2008, Badung football rise again with new club, PS Badung. They competed from Liga Indonesia Third Division Lesser Sunda Islands Region and keep going until in December 2014, they were promoted to the Liga Indonesia Premier Division after becoming 4th placed team in 2014 Liga Nusantara.

Stadium 
PS Badung plays their home matches at Gelora Samudra Stadium in Kuta.

Supporter 
Laskar Keris Badung Sakti and Basel (fullname Badung Selatan) are supporter of PS Badung.

Players

Current squad 
.

Club officials

Coaching Staff 

Source:

Managerial history

References 

Badung Regency
Football clubs in Indonesia
Football clubs in Bali
Association football clubs established in 2008
2008 establishments in Indonesia